Deep Blue Sea or The Deep Blue Sea may refer to:

The Deep Blue Sea (play), a 1952 stage play by Terence Rattigan
The Deep Blue Sea (1954 TV play), a 1954 British television play based on the Rattigan play
The Deep Blue Sea (1955 film), a 1955 British drama film based on the Rattigan play
The Deep Blue Sea (2011 film), a 2011 British drama film based on the Rattigan play
"Deep Blue Sea", a 1957 Country and Western hit for Jimmy Dean with lyrics by Martin Seligson
Deep Blue Sea (1999 film), a 1999 American science fiction horror film
Deep Blue Sea (soundtrack), soundtrack to the film
Deep Blue Sea 2 (2018 film), a stand-alone sequel to the 1999 film
Deep Blue Sea, a 2004 album by Davy Spillane
Deep Blue Sea (hat), an Australian hat

See also
Between the Devil and the Deep Blue Sea (disambiguation)
Deep Blue (disambiguation)
Sea (disambiguation)
Blue Sea
Deep sea